The Congregation of the Sacred Hearts of Jesus and Mary abbreviated SS.CC., is a Roman Catholic clerical religious congregation of Pontifical Right for men priests and brothers. The congregation is also known as the Picpus because their first house was on the Rue de Picpus in Paris, France.

History

French Revolution beginnings
The Congregation of the Sacred Hearts of Jesus and Mary arose amid the religious upheaval caused by the French Revolution.  In March 1792, the Frenchman Pierre Coudrin was secretly ordained to the priesthood.  The following May, Father Coudrin went into hiding in an attic of the granary of the Chateau d'Usseau and stayed confined there for six months to escape the government's persecution of the Catholic non-juring priests who refused to accept the Civil Constitution of the Clergy.  One evening during his time in hiding, Coudrin had a vision of himself surrounded by a heavenly illuminated group of priests, brothers and sisters dressed in white robes, which he took as his calling to establish a religious institute that would be the Congregation of the Sacred Hearts of Jesus and Mary.  Coudrin left the granary and began his underground ministry in Poitiers, waiting for the opportunity to start his group.

During his underground ministry in 1794, Coudrin met Henriette Aymer de Chevalerie.  She had been imprisoned for hiding a priest.  Upon her release, she told Coudrin of a vision she had while in prison calling her to the service of God. Coudrin and Henriette Aymer de Chevalerie shared with each other their visions of creating a religious institute in the midst of danger for Roman Catholics in France.

Establishing the Congregation
On Christmas Eve in 1800, despite knowing they could face the guillotine for their actions, Father Coudrin and Henriette Aymer de Chevalerie officially established the Congregation of the Sacred Hearts of Jesus and Mary.

In 1817, the Congregation was formally approved by the Pope as a single institute composed of a male and a female branch of religious and a lay branch.

The original members of the Congregation of the Sacred Hearts of Jesus and Mary founded new schools for poor children, seminaries to help grow the priesthood of their institute and parish missions throughout Europe. In 1825 the evangelization of the Sandwich Islands in the Pacific was entrusted by the Holy See to the Congregation of the Sacred Hearts, and the following year the first band of missionaries of the Sacred Hearts left France. At the time of Father Coudrin's death in 1837, the Congregation of the Sacred Hearts of Jesus and Mary had 276 priests and brothers and 1125 sisters.

In 1840 the Brothers founded a house in Louvain, Belgium. The Brothers settled in Spain (1880), the Netherlands (1892), England (1894) and the United States (1905).

The sisters, who concentrated their energies on education, went to Chile in 1838 and to Perú in 1848. They also started foundations in Honolulu in 1859 and Ecuador in 1862. Additional houses were founded in Spain (1881), Belgium (1894), England (1895), the Netherlands (1803) and the United States (1908).

The Congregation has been present in Ireland since 1948 and in the UK since 1956.

The Mission in the Pacific Islands

The religious institute set off on a new mission that would become their hallmark accomplishment. Teams of missionaries settled in the several Pacific Ocean islands to spread the Gospel, build churches, and evangelize new faithful.

The Congregation of the Sacred Hearts of Jesus and Mary was particularly successful in the Kingdom of Hawaii.  They established what is now the Roman Catholic Diocese of Honolulu and built the Cathedral of Our Lady of Peace, the oldest Roman Catholic cathedral in continuous use in the United States.  Hawaii's first six bishops, from 1833 to 1940, were members of the Congregation of the Sacred Hearts of Jesus and Mary. Other churches founded by the institute include Saint Joseph Catholic Church in Hilo and Maria Lanakila Catholic Church on Maui. Sacred Hearts Academy (K-12, girls) and St. Patrick's School (elementary, co-ed) in the Honolulu neighborhood of Kaimuki were both founded by the order.

Mission in the United States
In 1833 Reverends Edmundo Demellier, S.S.C.C. and Petithomme, S.S.C.C. began to minister to the Passamaquoddy people in Maine. The Congregation's first province in the United
States was established 1846. In 1850 they established the Santa Inés Mission (Chumash), in Solvang, California.

Notable members
 Peter Coudrin
 Saint Damien de Veuster
 Blessed Eustaquio van Lieshout
 Henri Systermans
 Joseph Hendricks
 Honoré Laval
 François Caret
 Étienne Jérôme Rouchouze
 Louis Désiré Maigret
 Alexis Bachelot
 Mateo Crawley-Boevey
 Florentin-Étienne Jaussen

References

External links
 Official website

 
Religious organizations established in 1800
Catholic organizations established in the 18th century
1800 establishments in France